Worsbrough is an area about two miles south of Barnsley in the metropolitan borough of Barnsley, South Yorkshire, England. Before 1974, Worsbrough had its own urban district council in the West Riding of the historic county of Yorkshire and it is still counted as a separate place from Barnsley by the 2011 Census, but it is often treated as part of Barnsley as the two settlements run into one another.

Geography
Worsbrough includes Worsbrough Bridge, Worsbrough Common, Worsbrough Dale, Worsbrough Village and Ward Green. The River Dove flows east–west through Worsbrough and the reservoir before joining the River Dearne and the area is built on its valley. The A61 traverses this large valley, south of Barnsley, before passing through Birdwell to junction 36 of the M1. A railway line, the former Woodhead Line, passed along the valley as well, which is now the Trans-Pennine Trail. It joined the Huddersfield-Barnsley Line at Silkstone Common to the west and across to Wombwell, a mile to the east, where it met the former Doncaster – Barnsley Line, which also is part of the Trans-Pennine Trail.

The B6100 meets the A61 in the centre of Worsbrough, and meets the A635 to the east at Ardsley. At Worsbrough Bridge, is a Pegasus crossing for horses across the A61 for the Trans-Pennine Trail.

The entire area is covered by the Worsbrough ward of Barnsley council. It does not include Birdwell.

Landmarks
Notable landmarks of Worsbrough include Houndhill, Wigfield Farm, Worsbrough Mill and Worsbrough Reservoir, which are in Worsbrough Country Park. There is also a canal which was a branch off the Dearne and Dove Canal.
 
There are also several pubs in the Worsbrough area, most notably The Cutting Edge (demolished), The Red Lion Country Inn (previously The Olive Branch, The Button Mill Inn, and before that, The Red Lion), The Greyhound, The Boatman's Rest (known locally as the Pod), the Wharf (Now the Mogul Room Indian Restaurant), The Ship, The Darley, The Masons Arms (demolished), Ward Green WMC, the Dale Tavern and Swaithe Main WMC.

History
Worsbrough dates back to the 7th century, and is listed within the wapentake of Staincross, West Riding of Yorkshire, in the Domesday Book of 1086:

In Wircesburg Gerneber and Haldene had five carucates of land and a half to be taxed where there may be four ploughs. Gamel and Chetelber now have it of Ilbert, themselves two ploughs, and four bordars, and one mill pays two shillings. Wood pasture half a mile long and half a mile broad. Value in King Edward's time four pounds, now thirty shillings.

The name 'Worsbrough' means 'Weorc's fortified place'. The village name was spelt Worsborough before the 19th century and through the 20th century.

Coal mining was central to the productivity of the area for centuries. Seventy five miners who were killed in the 1849 Darley Main Colliery disaster lay buried in the parish churchyard.

The Great Central Railway's Worsborough (or Worsbrough) Branch was a goods only branch running from West Silkstone Junction on the Penistone to Barnsley line to Wombwell Main Junction on the South Yorkshire Railway. Numerous coal mines were served along the route, but principally it was a bypass route to relieve congestion at Barnsley and there were no intermediate stations. The line was an engineering nightmare. There were two tunnels—Silkstone No. 1, 289 yards and Silkstone No. 2, 74 yards—and the grades were quite horrendous. The 7-mile Worsborough Bank included a 3-mile section at an average grade of 1 in 40. With the mining subsidence that took place over the years the grade was in places even worse, making this the steepest incline on a main line in Great Britain. The line opened to traffic on 2 August 1880. It was electrified as part of the Manchester to Sheffield and Wath electrification of the 1950s, but closed with the rest of that system in the 1981.

Places of Worship

Church of England
The Worsbrough Dale (St Thomas) and Worsbrough Common (St Luke) parish churches are part of the same group. Worsbrough Common parish covers the western fringes of the village including Ward Green. Worsbrough Dale parish covers the majority of the population of Worsbrough north of the river including Swaithe. It stretches up Hunningley Lane (B6100) as far as Birk Avenue.
 
Worsbrough Village (St Mary) church, south of the river near Worsbrough Hall, is part of the same group as Elsecar, and the parish covers most of the sparsely-populated area of Worsbrough south of the river and includes Birdwell and most of the M1 between the river and junction 36.

St Thomas and St James' Church
On Bank End Road in Worsbrough Dale.  The church was built in 1858 and consecrated in 1859. The Wentworth family of Wentworth Castle gave a donation of £2,000 and other people provided donations of smaller amounts or helped in other ways.  The total cost of the church building was about £3,000. Listed as Grade II by English Heritage.

St Mary's Church
St Mary's Church is a Grade I listed building in Worsbrough Village.

St Luke's Church
At Worsbrough Common.

Roman Catholic

On West Street (B6100). Our Lady and St James Church. Built 1902 by T. H. and F. Healey of Bradford. Listed as Grade II by English Heritage.

Community Church

On High Street.  The stonework on the east-facing frontage has the following inscriptions "AD 1903" (near the gable-end apex) and "Ebenezer Wesleyan Reform" (halfway down).  There are also foundation stones (two either side of the doorway) inscribed with "EBENEZER CHAPEL 1854".  This suggests that the chapel was built in 1854 and extended upwards in 1903.

Education
The Barnsley Academy, before 2006 formerly the Elmhirst School, provides secondary education to the area. It moved to a new site on Farm Road. Primary schools include Worsbrough Common Primary School, Ward Green Primary School, The Mill Academy formerly The Edmunds Primary School, Worsbrough Bank End Primary School and Worsbrough St Mary's C of E Primary School. Worsbrough St Mary's C of E Primary School closed on 31 December 2007 as a consequence of falling pupil numbers.

Sport and recreation
Worsbrough Bridge Athletic F.C. are based in Worsbrough, next to the River Dove and currently play in the Northern Counties East Football League. The Trans Pennine Trail runs through Worsbrough along the path of a disused railway line. Outdoor bowls can be played at High Street Bowling Club in Worsbrough Dale and Kendal Vale Bowling Club in Worsbrough Bridge. Adjacent to Worsbrough Bridge Athletic F.C. and Kendal Vale Bowling Club is Worsbrough Bridge Cricket Club who compete in the Yorkshire Cricket Southern Premier League.
Worsbrough Bridge Cricket Club are based next to the River Dove and play in divisions 3 and 8 of the YCSPL.

Arts
The Worsbrough Mystery Plays are held at St Mary's Church. Worsbrough Brass are the local brass band.

Notable residents

Arthur Scargill, b. 1938, trade unionist, was born and went to school here. 
Mick McCarthy, b. 1959, football manager, was born in Worsbrough Bridge and attended Worsbrough High School.

See also
Listed buildings in Worsbrough

References

External links

 Barnsley Family History Society website
 Worsbrough Brass
 The Barnsley Academy

Villages in South Yorkshire
Unparished areas in South Yorkshire
Geography of Barnsley